Anriette Schoeman (born 25 August 1977) is a road cyclist from South Africa. She represented her nation at the 2001, 2006, 2008 and 2010 UCI Road World Championships. She also competed in the women's individual road race at the 2004 Summer Olympics.

References

External links
 profile at Procyclingstats.com

1977 births
Afrikaner people
South African female cyclists
Living people
Place of birth missing (living people)
Olympic cyclists of South Africa
Cyclists at the 2004 Summer Olympics
People from Walter Sisulu Local Municipality
21st-century South African women